Chain Reaction Research is a think-tank, which conducts research about deforestation-relation topics and commodities. It is based in Washington DC.

It provides material about resources effected by deforestation such as palm oil, soy, cattle, cacao, coffee, and pulp and paper. It aims to put pressure on investors to include financial risks to be associated with companies that deal with deforestation It is frequently cited in scientific journals and used in information campaigns of environmental NGOs. It has exposed land abuse and illegal deforestation in South-east Asia and other regions.

Funding

It is sponsored by the David and Lucile Packard Foundation, Norway's International Climate and Forest Initiative and the Gordon and Betty Moore Foundation.

Reference section

External links section
chainreactionresearch.com

Think tanks based in the United States
Deforestation
Think tanks based in Washington, D.C.